Neny Island or (Neny Islands as a variant name) is an island  long which rises to , lying  northwest of Roman Four Promontory and directly north of the mouth of Neny Fjord, off the west coast of Graham Land in Antarctica. Neny Island was discovered by the British Graham Land Expedition (BGLE) (1934–1937) under John Riddoch Rymill and named after nearby Neny Fjord.

Named features 
Several features on Neny Island have been charted and named by various Antarctic expeditions.

Store Point is the island's northernmost point. It was surveyed in 1947 by the Falkland Islands Dependencies Survey (FIDS), who so named it because FIDS maintained an emergency food store on this point.

Norseman Point is the easternmost point. First surveyed in 1936 by the British expedition under Rymill and later named by FIDS after the Norseman airplane which landed near the point to relieve the FIDS party on Stonington Island in February 1950.

See also 
 Composite Antarctic Gazetteer
 List of Antarctic and sub-Antarctic islands
 List of Antarctic islands south of 60° S
 SCAR
 Territorial claims in Antarctica

References

Islands of Graham Land
Fallières Coast